FK Napredak Donji Kokoti or simply Napredak was a Montenegrin football club based in suburb of Podgorica named Donji Kokoti. The club was founded in 1971, and dissolved after the season 1994–95.

History
Following the expansion of football, after 1970 in Podgorica region (then Titograd), especially in suburbs, were formed numerous amateur clubs, like FK Crvena Stijena from Tološi, Partizan from Momišići, Ribnica from Konik, Bratstvo from Cijevna, Avijatičar, Poštar from Stari Aerodrom, Metalac, Agrokombinat and others. Among them were two clubs from Lješkopolje region. First, at 1971, was founded FK Napredak from Donji Kokoti, and three years later Mladost Lješkopolje (present-day FK Podgorica).

Napredak started as a member of Titogradski podsavez, a lowest football rank in Montenegro. After the transformation of competition system in SFR Yugoslavia, club mostly played in Central region league (Fourth level).

See also
 Donji Kokoti

References

FK Napredak Donji Kokoti
FK Napredak Donji Kokoti
Defunct football clubs in Montenegro
Association football clubs established in 1970
Association football clubs disestablished in 1995
FK Napredak Donji Kokoti
FK Napredak Donji Kokoti